The following is a list of jazz-influenced classical compositions. Classical music has often incorporated elements or material from popular music of the composer's time. Jazz has influenced classical music, particularly early and mid-20th-century composers, including Maurice Ravel.

References

Jazz
Jazz-influenced classical compositions
 
Classical